Bhadvana is a village in Lakhtar Taluka of Surendranagar district, Gujarat, India. It is situated about twelve miles north east of Wadhwan station and about five miles south of Lakhtar railway station.

History
During British period, Bhadvana is a separate tribute-paying taluka under the Wadhwan station thana. The Garasias were Jhalas   Rajput and Bhayad of Limbadi. The taluka consisted of two villages, Bhadvana and Khajeli, then.

There is a large tank at Bhadvana south of the village. The quality of the land is inferior, as much of it is salt waste.

References

 This article incorporates text from a publication now in the public domain: 

Villages in Surendranagar district